Hohenlohe-Ingelfingen was a German County of the House of Hohenlohe, located in northeastern Baden-Württemberg, Germany, around Ingelfingen. Hohenlohe-Ingelfingen was a scion of Hohenlohe-Langenburg. It was raised from a County to a Principality in 1764, and was mediatised to Württemberg in 1806.

Counts of Hohenlohe-Ingelfingen (1701–1764)
Christian Kraft, Count of Hohenlohe-Langenburg, from 1701 to 1743 
Philip Henry (died 1781), Count from 1743 to 1764

Princes of Hohenlohe-Ingelfingen (1764–1806)
Philip Henry (died 1781), prince from 1764 to 1781
Henry Augustus (died 1796), prince from  1781 to 1796
Frederick Louis (1746–1818), prince from 1796 to 1806, resigned in favour of his son:
Adolf Karl Friedrich Ludwig (1797–1873) who held the title for less than a year before the principality was mediatized under Württemberg suzerainty.

Post-mediatization
Friedrich Karl Wilhelm, Fürst zu Hohenlohe-Ingelfingen (1752–1814)

Notes

References

Counties of the Holy Roman Empire